Gemmulimitra avenacea is a species of sea snail, a marine gastropod mollusk in the family Mitridae, the miters or miter snails.

Description
The shell size varies between 12 mm and 32 mm

Distribution
This species is distributed in the Indian Ocean along the Mascarene Basin and in the Pacific Ocean along the Philippines, Indonesia, Fiji, Papua New Guinea

References

 Cernohorsky W. O. (1976). The Mitrinae of the World. Indo-Pacific Mollusca 3(17) page(s): 411
 Drivas, J. & M. Jay (1988). Coquillages de La Réunion et de l'île Maurice

External links
 Gastropods.com : Mitra (Nebularia) avenacea; accessed : 10 December 2010

Mitridae
Gastropods described in 1845